Any Reasonable Offer is a short story by Kurt Vonnegut, first published on 19 January 1952  in Collier's weekly, and later in Bagombo Snuff Box in 1999. 

The story is written in first person, from the perspective of a real estate agent in Newport, who tries to sell a large mansion to a Colonel, who tricks him into letting the colonel live in the house and enjoy its hospitality for free. It is revealed that the Colonel and his wife travel around and stay in expensive mansions, tricking real estate agents into believing that they are interested. In the end, nearly broke, the real estate agent moves out of the city and starts copying the Colonel, staying in mansions for free, tricking other real estate agents into thinking he is interested in buying their property.

References
 

Short stories by Kurt Vonnegut
1952 short stories